Francis Augustine Deleglise (February 10, 1835March 25, 1894) was a Swiss American immigrant, surveyor, and businessman.  He was one of the first settlers at what is now Antigo, Wisconsin, and he represented Florence, Forest, and Langlade counties in the Wisconsin State Assembly in the 1893 session.  During the American Civil War, he served in the famed Iron Brigade of the Army of the Potomac and was wounded at Antietam and Gettysburg.

Biography
Born in Bagnes, Valais, Switzerland, Deleglise emigrated to the United States in 1848 and settled in Wisconsin. Deleglise lived in Dodge, Manitowoc Counties, Wisconsin, and in Appleton, Wisconsin. During the American Civil War, Deleglise served in the 6th Wisconsin Infantry Regiment and was badly wounded. In 1877, he settled in the present city of Antigo, Wisconsin which he platted and started. Deleglise was involved in the real estate business and was a surveyor. He was a Democrat and then after the American Civil War became a Republican. Deleglise served as chairman of the Antigo Town Board. He also served on the Langlade County, Wisconsin Board of Supervisors and was chairman of the county board. Deleglise served as the Langlade County treasurer and served on the school board. In 1893, Deleglise served in the Wisconsin State Assembly. He died in Antigo, Wisconsin, while still in the Wisconsin Assembly.

Legacy
The log cabin, where Deleglise and his family lived, has been preserved and located at the Langlade County Historical Society, in Antigo, Wisconsin.

Notes

External links

|-

1835 births
1894 deaths
Swiss emigrants to the United States
People from Bagnes
People from Antigo, Wisconsin
People of Wisconsin in the American Civil War
American surveyors
American city founders
Businesspeople from Wisconsin
Wisconsin Democrats
Mayors of places in Wisconsin
County supervisors in Wisconsin
County officials in Wisconsin
School board members in Wisconsin
19th-century American politicians
19th-century American businesspeople
Republican Party members of the Wisconsin State Assembly